The qualification for women's football tournament at the 2008 Summer Olympics.

Qualifications
A total of twelve teams will participate in the finals of the Olympic tournament for women.  These finalists were:

AFC
 was automatically qualified for the Olympics as host.

First round
 and  received bye for the final round. Other 12 teams are divided into 3 groups, where top two teams in each group would advance to the final round.

Group A was played as a knockout tournament of two-legged (Home&Away) matches. Each of Group B and Group C was played as a single round robin.

Group A
First leg played on 17 February 2007. Second leg played on 25 February 2007.

Hong Kong through to the final after Jordan withdrew from the tournament. The final first and second leg played on 10 March 2007 and 18 March 2007 respectively.

Group B
All matches were held at Thai-Japanese Stadium (Bangkok, Thailand).

Group C
All matches were held at Zhongshan Soccer Stadium (Taipei, Taiwan).

21 February 2007

23 February 2007

25 February 2007

Final Round

Group winners would qualify for the Olympics. Matches played from 7 April to 12 August 2007.

Group A

Group B

CAF
Preliminary competition was divided in four rounds. First three rounds was knock-out rounds, and the final round was a group stage.

The winners of the final round would qualify for the Olympics. The runners-up of the round would advance to inter-continental play-off.

Preliminary round
First leg played from 27 to 29 October 2006. Second leg played from 10 to 12 November 2006.

* = withdrew

First round
First leg played on 17 and 18 February 2007. Second leg will play from 9 to 11 March 2007. Eritrea and Morocco will play their matches on 10 and 24 March 2007. Guinea and Zimbabwe only played one leg in Zimbabwe due to political unrest in Guinea.

* = withdrew

Second round
First leg played from 1 to 3 June 2007. Second leg played from 15 to 17 June 2007.

Final Round
Matches played between 27 July 2007 and 14 March 2008. Ethiopia withdrew.

28 July 2007

12 August 2007

26 August 2007

9 December 2007

16 February 2008

15 March 2008

Nigeria qualified for the Olympics. Ghana advanced to the inter-continental play-off.

CONCACAF

Preliminary round

Caribbean Zone
The system is a two-round single round robin format, held in October 2007. Four groups will play the first round (3 groups of 4 and one group of 3), with the winners moving on to a second round group.

First round

Second round
The 4 remaining teams were drawn into 2 pairings.  The winners of each tie will progress to the CONCACAF Finals. Both Puerto Rico v Trinidad & Tobago matches will be played in Puerto Rico on 23 & 25 November 2007. Cuba will play both legs at home against Jamaica on 29 November and 1 December 2007, with the second match counting as Jamaica's home match for away goals purposes.

Central American Zone
Two home and away series will be played, with the winners moving on to the final round. The first leg will play on 6 October 2007. The second leg will play on 13 October 2007. The winners of the ties will play in the decisive final round on 20 and 27 October 2007.

Panama withdrew from their scheduled match against Costa Rica, so Costa Rica advance to the 2nd Round where they will play the winner of El Salvador v Nicaragua.

Group stage
Six teams will qualify for the final round. The final round will be held at the Estadio Olímpico Universitario in Ciudad Juárez, Mexico, from 2–13 April.  The draw was held at 11:00 am (EST) on 25 February.

Knockout stage
The winners of the semi-finals qualified for the Olympics.

CONMEBOL
CONMEBOL announced that the 2006 Sudamericano Femenino in Argentina would also serve as the qualifying tournament for the Olympics.  won the tournament, and qualified for the Olympics. The runners-up  advanced to the inter-continental play-off.

OFC
The 2007 Pacific Games was played as the first part of Oceania qualification for the 2008 Olympics.  The winners of the Pacific Games, Papua New Guinea, met New Zealand in a playoff in March 2008 for a place in the Olympic Games Finals.  This had originally been scheduled over two legs (on 8 and 12 March) but the New Zealand leg was cancelled by mutual consent, leaving a single play-off match in Papua New Guinea.

UEFA

UEFA announced that the 2007 Women's World Cup in the People's Republic of China will also serve as the qualifying tournament for the Olympics. Originally it was thought that, should England make the top three European teams, they would compete under the United Kingdom banner. However, on 6 September 2007, FIFA issued a press release indicating that England are ineligible to participate in the 2008 Olympics as England does not have its own Olympic Committee.

As the result of the World Cup, Germany (winners) and Norway (fourth place) qualified for the Olympics, while Sweden and Denmark (both eliminated in the group stage) qualified for the play-off. There has been some further confusion over the identity of the UEFA qualifiers stemming from conflicting media releases from UEFA and FIFA.  The FIFA release noted that "teams eliminated at the end of the group phase will have the same ranking irrespective of their position, number of points or goal differences", which implies that Sweden and Denmark will require a playoff for the final qualification spot.  While UEFA initially stated that no playoff was required , this was amended fairly rapidly .

Olympic play-off

|}

Sweden won 7–3 on aggregate and qualified for the Olympics.

CONMEBOL–CAF play-off

An inter-continental play-off was held between the second placed South American and African teams, which were Brazil and Ghana, respectively.

References

External links
  Fixtures and results on AFC's website (Women's tournament)

Women's football at the 2008 Summer Olympics
AFC Women's Olympic Qualifying Tournament